Sophie Anne Hunt, known by the name of Anna Thillon (Calcutta or London, 1812 or 1813 or 22 June 1817 or circa 1819; Torquay, 5 May 1903), was an operatic singing sensation in the United States, based in San Francisco, California and then New York, New York. She performed in the former city's first professional season.

Her parents were Elisa(beth) and Joseph Hunt. 

Mrs. Hunt came from a noble family, thanks to which, for her daughter, all the doors of aristocratic houses were opened.

Mr. Hunt was a rich merchant, possibly also from a noble family, as The Musical World of 1840 states that Sophie Ann Hunt belonged to one of the aristocratic families of England. But by the 14th birthday of the future singer, mr. Hunt went bankrupt. This was the reason for mrs. Hunt, taking her daughters with her, to leave for France.

Sophie Ann Hunt had much of her training in France where she studied with Marco Bordogni, Giovanni Tadolini and Claude Thomas Thillon, conductor of the Havre Philharmonic Society, whom she married. After appearances in the provinces, she made her debut at the Paris Théâtre de la Renaissance in 1838 in the title role of Albert Grisar's Lady Melvil. In 1840 she moved to the Opéra-Comique where she created the roles of Catarina in Les diamants de la couronne (1841) and Casilda in La part du diable (1843) by Daniel Auber, who had a passion for her. She made her English debut in 1844 at the London Princess's Theatre, repeating the role of Catarina. She later sang at the Drury Lane creating Stella in Balfe's The Enchantress. Her American career began in 1851 but she retired four years later.

Around 1840–1855, the artist Henry Willard painted an oil portrait of her.

After her relatively early retirement she lived in the English seaside town of Torquay (census records) and died there as a widow at 84. There is no record of any children.

She had at least two sisters, Elizabeth Victoria Hunt and Mary Charlotte Hunt (1825-1913). Mary Charlotte Hunt in 1845 met a Georgian prince from the Bagration-Davydov family (Bagration-Davitishvili), married him, becoming Princess Mariya Iosifovna Bagration-Davydova, went to the Russian Empire, where she died at an advanced age.

References
Notes

Sources

 Sadie, Stanley (ed) (1997).The New Grove Dictionary of Opera. Oxford University Press, IV, p. 725. 
 Snodgrass, Mary Ellen (2018). Frontier Women and Their Art: A Chronological Encyclopedia. Rowman & Littlefield, p.99
 Novello, J. Alfredo (1840). The Musical World, Volume 14. p.190

English operatic sopranos
1819 births
1903 deaths
19th-century British women opera singers